Howard Cissell (born August 21, 1936) is a former Canadian football player who played for the Montreal Alouettes. He played college football at Arkansas State University.

References

Living people
1936 births
Players of American football from Kansas
American football halfbacks
Canadian football running backs
American players of Canadian football
Arkansas State Red Wolves football players
Montreal Alouettes players
People from West Memphis, Arkansas